Ewa Rybak (born 22 December 1974) is a retired javelin thrower from Poland. She set her personal best (60.76 metres) on 11 July 1999 in Palma de Mallorca, winning the gold medal in the women's javelin throw event at the 1999 Summer Universiade.

Achievements

References

1974 births
Living people
Polish female javelin throwers
People from Brodnica County
Sportspeople from Kuyavian-Pomeranian Voivodeship
Universiade medalists in athletics (track and field)
Skra Warszawa athletes
Universiade gold medalists for Poland
Medalists at the 1999 Summer Universiade
Competitors at the 1997 Summer Universiade
20th-century Polish women